The AMC Institute (AMCI) is the global membership organization of the association management company, or AMC, industry. It was founded in 1963 and is headquartered in Alexandria, Virginia, U.S. Nearly 200 AMCs are members. These members employ 3,500 people and manage trade associations and professional societies that have more than 2.8 million members.

As of 2016, AMCI provides accreditation for its members based upon the American National Standards Institute-approved standard. In 2007, to provide clearer direction to associations interested in being managed by AMCs, the institute and the American Society of Association Executives (ASAE) agreed to support the institute's AMC accreditation program.

AMC Institute's members include the world's largest association management company, SmithBucklin, as well as the world's largest professional conference organiser, MCI Group. The total budget for associations managed by AMCI members is more than $1.5 billion.

In 2023, the institute formed a strategic partnership with the International Association of Professional Congress Organisers (IAPCO).

History
AMCI was founded in 1963 as the Multiple Association Management Institute. It since has undergone several name changes, including the Institute of Association Management Companies (IAMC) in 1976 and the International Association of Association Management Companies (IAAMC) in 1996. In the early 2000s, AMCs from ASAE and IAAMC joined to form the AMC Institute, a marketing arm to support the promotion of the AMC model. AMCs could purchase a partnership with the AMC Institute, regardless of their membership in IAAMC or ASAE. 

In 2005, IAAMC changed its name to AMC Institute, assumed the AMC marketing responsibilities and, in 2006, the organization assumed the AMC Institute name.

See also
 Association management company
 Association management
 Nonprofit organization

References

External links 

 Official website:

External links
 AMC Institute

Management organizations
Non-profit organizations based in Alexandria, Virginia